Bhagwatipur is a village in Rahata taluka of Ahmednagar district in the Indian state of Maharashtra.

Population
As per, 2011 census of India population of village is 7403. 3765 of them are male and 3638 are females.

Economy
Agriculture and allied work is main occupation. The temple of Bhagwati Devi after which the village is named is center of pilgrim's attention.

Transport

Road
Bhagwatipur is connected to nearby cities Nagar - Manmad highway and villages by village roads.

Rail
Shrirampur railway station is nearest railway station.

Air
Shirdi Airport is the nearest airport.

See also
List of villages in Rahata taluka

References 

Villages in Ahmednagar district